Boys Life 4 is an anthology of four gay-themed short films that have been hits on the film festival circuit.

Short films
 O Beautiful (2002, directed by Alan Brown), tells the aftermath of a gay bashing. Shown in split screen.
 Jay Gillespie
 David Rogers
 L.T.R. (2002, directed by Phillip J. Bartell), a mockumentary about a gay couple in a "long-term relationship."
 Cole Williams
 Weston Mueller
 Bumping Heads (2002, directed by Brian Sloan), about two men who hold different views about their relationship. (one is in love, and the other one just want to be friends).
 Craig Chester
 Andersen Gabrych
 This Car Up (2003, directed by Eric Mueller), about a messenger and businessman who cross paths. It uses slot machine type images to convey what both characters are thinking.
 Michael Booth
 Brent Doyle

See also
 List of American films of 2003
 Boys Life
 Boys Life 2
 Boys Life 3

References

External links 
 

2003 drama films
2003 films
American LGBT-related films
Boys Life films
American anthology films
2003 LGBT-related films
2000s English-language films
2000s American films